M. Arunachalam (4 March 1944 – 21 January 2004) was an Indian politician and former Member of Parliament elected from Tamil Nadu. He was elected to the Lok Sabha from Tenkasi constituency as an Indian National Congress candidate in 1977, 1980, 1984, 1989 and 1991 elections and as a Tamil Maanila Congress (Moopanar) candidate in 1996 election.

Early life 

M.Arunachalam was born on 4 March 1944 to Mr.Moockiah and Mrs.Muthammal in Vellanaikottai village, in the district of Tenkasi, southernmost part of India. It is a small village at the foot of western ghat region. The days when there was no electricity and traveling facilities as we have now, Arunachalam enjoyed life as a son of an agriculturist in the green fields enjoying nature in its unpolluted form, helping his parents in the fields, taking care of the crops and livestock. Swimming was his favourite hobby in which he excelled. 
 
He is the second son of a family of six children- having an elder brother, two younger brothers and two younger sisters and was the second graduate from his village after his elder brother. From childhood he experienced the social evils like untouchability,  economical injustice, colour race and casteism all which gave him the determination to do something for the society and decided that politics is the only way by which he can serve his community.

He suffered several humiliations during his life as a student, but he was firm and the sufferings he had undergone had strengthened his resolve to become somebody in the society. 
  
He made a strong decision to study well, convinced that education alone would unlock the doors of opportunities and pave way for advancement- for without knowledge and education, there can be no power.
 
He finished his schooling in Pulliangudi and Vasudevanallur, walking 2–4 km daily.
 
He did his pre-university course from V.O.Chidambram College Tuticorin, graduated from St.Xaviers college, Palayamkottai, had his post-graduation from Gandhigram University, Dindugul, and Bachelor of Law from Law College, Chennai.
 
During(after his degree, post graduation and law college studies) the holidays Arunachalam did not want to sit idle so he worked in offices like National Small Savings Corporation and All India Radio, Trichy.

Post-education 

After he got his law degree, his ambition of becoming a lawyer was fulfilled. He started his career as a junior advocate under T.S. Ramanatha Iyer – a straightforward, upright person with Gandhian principles who was called ‘Tiger of the bar’ in Tenkasi.
 
       
By sheer hard work and perseverance, he had a roaring practice, soon he established an office for himself and expanded it with four colleagues and two juniors. He was selected for the post of Munsif for Pondicherry Sessions court, which he did not want to join. He was always ready to subordinate his personal advancement for the cause of the country and for the cause of depressed classes for whom he was the only hope.

Political career 

Despite several acknowledged handicaps and limitations, Arunachalam rose from very humble beginnings entering politics at an early age and was quickly enticed to national politics at his young age. As a mere party volunteer, he was Youth Congress Secretary in Tirunelveli (District Congress Committee). In 1977 he first contested, won and became the Member of Parliament from Tenkasi (Reserved constituency). That was the period when The Janata Party formed its Government in the center for the first time. Since power did not matter to Arunachalam he was ready to be in the opposition. As a man of Gandhian Principles he did not hesitate to stand by the democratic values of his party. 
  
Throughout his long political career he was steadfast to his loyalty to the Congress and the Gandhian moral and political ideology and he never felt himself persuaded by the rationalist, atheistic, religious, iconoclastic, communal and secessionist ideologies of his time.

Drawn by an irresistible inner spirit of nationalism he reached the possible highest rank in the country(Union Cabinet Minister), also achieved a high reputation for his record of performance as a competent and efficient Member of Parliament during his six consecutive terms of his office to the Lok Sabha making up two decades and an outstanding national leader. He provided an unprecedented kind of leadership with simple, astute and pragmatic principles. 
 
He had attained popularity, which was unique. There were other leaders who were respected, looked up to and loved but the adoration which M.Arunachalam had, could hardly be rivaled by many others. The impact of M.Arunachalam in the socio-political life of Tamil Nadu is so unassailable that even his better political adversaries had to invoke the political traditions of M.Arunachalam for their political survivals.

During his long and busy life, he came in close and active contact with a number of state and national leaders and his relations with them, how he reacted to them and their social and political activities, and how he, in his turn influenced them is a matter of particular interest to one and all. His position in the country's affairs brought him close to a number of prominent personalities and often he was called upon to intervene and settle disputes in the organization, which he did successfully for the most part, on the basis of his knowledge of men and matters and using his innate talent for effecting a consensus in complex political situations.

Positions held 
 District Youth Congress Secretary Tirunelveli District (1972–1977)
 Member Of Parliament (1977–1979, first time)
 President – Tamil Nadu Youth Congress (1977–1981)
 Member of Parliament (1980–1984, second time)
 Member of Parliament (1984–1989, third time)
 Union Minister of State for Industries (1985–1989)
 Member of Parliament (1989–1991, fourth time)
 Member, Committee on Subordinate Legislation (January 1990 to September 1990)
 Member of Parliament (1991–1996, fifth time)
 Union Minister of State for Urban Development (1991–1993)
 Union Minister of State for Small Scale and  Agro Industries (1993–1995)
 Member of Parliament (1996–1998, sixth time)
 Union Cabinet Minister for Urban Development and Employment (a few months in 1996)
 Union Cabinet Minister in the Ministry of Labour (August 1996–May 1997)
 Union Cabinet Minister Chemicals and Fertilizers (June 1997–December 1997)

Death 

M. Arunachalam died on 21 January 2004 in Chennai at the age of 60.

References 

Indian National Congress politicians from Tamil Nadu
Union Ministers from Tamil Nadu
1944 births
2004 deaths
Lok Sabha members from Tamil Nadu
India MPs 1977–1979
India MPs 1980–1984
India MPs 1984–1989
India MPs 1989–1991
India MPs 1991–1996
India MPs 1996–1997
Tamil Maanila Congress politicians
People from Tirunelveli district
Labour ministers of India
Members of the Cabinet of India
Tamil Nadu politicians